Mariehamn sub-region  is a subdivision of Åland and one of the Sub-regions of Finland since 2009.

Sub-regions of Finland
Geography of Åland